La comunidad may refer to:
 La comunidad (agency), an advertising agency
 La comunidad (film), a 2000 Spanish film